American Catholic Church and American Catholic commonly refer to:
 Catholic Church in the United States, the Catholic Church, also known as the Roman Catholic Church, in the US

American Catholic Church may also refer to:

 American Catholic Church (1894), a 1894 –  independent confederation of churches, composed of congregations which individually separated from the Catholic Church, founded by Anton Francis Kołaszewski and Alfons Mieczysław Chrostowski
 American Catholic Church (1915), a sect founded by Joseph René Vilatte and incorporated in Illinois in 1915
 American Catholic Church in the United States, a sect founded by Lawrence J. Harms and incorporated in Maryland in 1999

American Catholic may also refer to:

 AmericanCatholic.org, a Franciscan Media website with online editions of Catholic Update and St. Anthony Messenger

See also
 Catholic Church, also known as the Roman Catholic Church
 Catholic Church by country
 Christianity in the United States
 Religion in the United States